Gaspard Rigaud (1 June 1661 – 28 March 1705) was a French painter and portraitist. He was born in Perpignan, the younger brother of the portraitist Hyacinthe Rigaud. Gaspard's daughter married Hyacinthe's pupil Jean Ranc.  Gaspard Rigaud died in Paris.

1661 births
1705 deaths
17th-century French painters
French male painters
18th-century French painters
18th-century French male artists